Offerings II: All I Have to Give is a 2003 album by Christian rock band Third Day, and their sixth studio album. It is the band's second worship album, and features live recordings from the Come Together Fall Tour in 2002.

Track listing

Personnel 
Third Day
 Mac Powell – lead vocals, acoustic guitar
 Brad Avery – guitars
 Mark Lee – guitars
 Tai Anderson – bass
 David Carr – drums, percussion

Additional personnel

 Monroe Jones – keyboards, acoustic piano
 Scotty Wilbanks – acoustic piano, Hammond B3 organ
 George Cocchini – acoustic guitar (10)
 Ken Lewis – percussion
 Geof Barkley – backing vocals
 Michael Mellett – backing vocals, choir
 Lisa Cochran – choir
 Kim Keyes – choir
 Chris Rodriguez – choir
 Michael Tait (of DC Talk) – lead and backing vocals (8)

Production

 Monroe Jones – producer (1, 2, 4, 7, 9, 10)
 Third Day – producers (3, 5, 6, 8, 11, 12)
 Robert Beeson – executive producer
 Bob Wohler – executive producer
 Jim Dineen – studio track recording and mixing (1, 2, 4, 7, 9, 10), live track recording, mixing and editing (3, 5, 6, 8, 11, 12)
 Rob Dennis – live track recording (3, 5, 6, 8, 11, 12)
 Andrew Stone – live track recording (3, 5, 6, 8, 11, 12)
 Karl Egsieker – studio recording assistant (1, 2, 4, 7, 9, 10)
 Phillip Martin – studio recording assistant (1, 2, 4, 7, 9, 10)
 Richard Dodd – studio track mixing (1, 2, 4, 7, 9, 10), mastering at Vital Recordings, Nashville, Tennessee
 Jeremy Cottrell – studio track mix assistant (1, 2, 4, 7, 9, 10)
 Michelle Pearson – A&R
 Terria Saunders – art direction
 Bert Sumner – art direction, design, additional church photography
 Jordyn Thomas – art direction
 Kristin Barlowe – band and church photography
 Bill Massey – inside traycard photography
 Traci Sgrignoll – hair and make-up

Charts

References

Third Day albums
2003 albums
Essential Records (Christian) albums